The 1994 Kremlin Cup was a men's tennis tournament played on indoor carpet courts. It was the 5th edition of the Kremlin Cup, and was part of the World Series of the 1994 ATP Tour. It took place at the Olympic Stadium in Moscow, Russia, from 7 November through 13 November 1994. Unseeded Alexander Volkov won the singles title.

Finals

Singles

 Alexander Volkov defeated  Chuck Adams, 6–2, 6–4
 It was Volkov's 1st singles title of the year and the 3rd and last of his career.

Doubles

 Jacco Eltingh /  Paul Haarhuis defeated  David Adams /  Andrei Olhovskiy, W/O
 It was Eltingh's 8th title of the year and 20th title overall. It was Haarhuis's 8th title of the year and 21st title overall.

References

External links
 Official website
 ITF tournament edition details

Kremlin Cup
Kremlin Cup
Kremlin Cup
Kremlin Cup
Kremlin Cup